Mitchell Hooks (1923 – March 2013)  was an American artist and illustrator known for his artwork for paperback books and magazines.

Biography
Hooks was born in Detroit, Michigan and attended Cass Technical High School. He joined the United States Army as an infantryman in 1944 and deployed to Germany after World War II for occupation duty. He became a second lieutenant. He then began his freelance illustration career in New York City. 

He painted paperback covers for Avon, Bantam Books, Dell Books, Fawcett Publications and others, and illustrated for magazines including Cosmopolitan, The Saturday Evening Post, The Ladies' Home Journal, Redbook, McCall's, and Woman's Day. He illustrated romance novels, science fiction and crime fiction, such as Ross Macdonald's Lew Archer, Peter Corris's Cliff Hardy and B.B. Johnston's Superspade series.

Hooks illustrated the 36-page booklet How to Respect and Display Our Flag for the U.S. Marine Corps. He also designed film posters, including the first James Bond movie, Dr. No — for which he painted  "the iconic image of Sean Connery as Bond" — and The Face of Fu Manchu.

In later years he also illustrated hardcover books for The Franklin Library, Reader's Digest Books and Coronado Publishers, and did advertising art.

Hooks was 89 when he died.

Awards
In 1999, he was inducted into the Society of Illustrators Hall of Fame.

References

External links
Mitchell H. Hooks Obituary
Mitchell Hooks paperback covers
. Reprinted with permission. Part 2, Part 3, Part 4

Further reading
"The Paperback Art of Mitchell Hooks", Illustration Magazine 10

1923 births
2013 deaths
American illustrators
Film poster artists
Artists from Detroit
United States Army officers
American expatriates in Germany
Cass Technical High School alumni